Events from the year 1972 in North Korea.

Incumbents
Premier: Kim Il-sung (until 28 December) Kim Il (starting 28 December)
Supreme Leader: Kim Il-sung

Events
July 4th North–South Korea Joint Statement
1972 North Korean parliamentary election

Births

 March 4 - Pae Gil-su.

See also
Years in Japan
Years in South Korea

References

 
North Korea
1970s in North Korea
Years of the 20th century in North Korea
North Korea